"Opus" is an instrumental by Swedish DJ and producer Eric Prydz. It was released as a digital download on 27 July 2015 as the fourth single from his debut studio album Opus (2016). The instrumental was written and produced by Eric Prydz and peaked at number three in Belgium.

Composition
"Opus" is an instrumental house track set to the F♯ minor key at a tempo of 126 beats per minute. It starts as a set of electronic synths set at 31.5 BPM and gradually builds up to a progressive house track as it continues to accelerate to 126 BPM in a range of three minutes and 42 seconds.

Track listing

Chart performance

Release history

Track history
Opus was first played as the finale track for Prydz's 2015 set at EDC Las Vegas. In just over a month after first play, the song was released on Beatport. It has been played as the penultimate track in all seven EPIC 4.0 sets this far.

References

2015 songs
Eric Prydz songs